The Southwestern University, officially the Southwestern University PHINMA (SWU PHINMA), is a private university in Cebu City, Philippines.

Founded and opened in the summer of 1946 by two pharmacists, SWU originally started as Southwestern Colleges and achieved university status on December 11, 1959. The university and its base hospital were acquired by PHINMA Education, a subsidiary of PHINMA Corporation in 2015. The university was renamed to Southwestern University PHINMA and the hospital from Sacred Heart Hospital to Southwestern University Medical Center. The university changed the logo and closed its South Campus in Basak San Nicolas, Cebu City.

It has a large number of international students from different countries. It is widely recognized as the most diverse institution in Cebu due to the various nationality of students that came from 34 countries in five continents.

Presidents
Matias H. Aznar II (1946–1958), founder
Anunciacion B. Aznar (1958–1968), co-founder
Gabino Tabuñar (1968–1973)
Matias B. Aznar III (1973–1975, 1978–1980)
Julian B. Yballe	(1975–1978)
Manolo S. Fornolles (1981–1990)
Alicia P. Cabatingan (1990–2001)	
Frances Victoria F. Lumain (2001–2006)	
Lassi Matti A. Holopainen (2006–2007)
Peter S. Aznar (March 2007–June 2007), acting president
Eldigario D. Gonzales (2007–2010)
Elsa A. Suralta, CESO VI (2010–2013)
Noe G. Quiñanola (2013–2014)
Chito B. Salazar (2014–present)

Campuses
Southwestern University is in the south of the City of Cebu, Philippines. The university has two campuses. The main campus is located on Urgello St. and the Aznar Coliseum Complex is on Aznar Road, just some 200 meters away from the main campus.

The university once had a South Campus (Basak Campus) on E. Sabellano St., Basak San Nicolas, Cebu City. The South Campus has since closed and has been in operation by another school. The closed South Campus formerly housed the College of Veterinary Medicine, the Veterinary Teaching Hospital, and the Elementary and High School Training Departments. All programs were transferred to the Main and Aznar Coliseum Complex campuses.

Main Campus
The main campus is the home of the colleges of School of Design + Communication, Arts and Sciences, School of Business, Computer Studies, Criminology, Dentistry, Engineering, Graduate School, Law, Maritime, Medical Technology, Medicine, Optometry, Pharmacy, Physical Therapy, and Teachers' College.

The Southwestern Medical Center (formerly Sacred Heart Hospital), Pathology and Biology Museums, Library, Interfaith Chapel, Botanical Garden, and the Administrative Offices are found in the main campus.

Aznar Coliseum Complex
Located about 200 meters from the main campus, the complex is made up of Aznar Memorial Coliseum, a ballpark, and the Anunciacion B. Aznar building which houses the Pre-Elementary, Elementary Department and High School Departments, the Maritime Regiment, the 540th NROTC Unit, Department of Physical Education and the College of Nursing.

Academic programs

Current programs since PHINMA acquisition (Graduate School inclusive):

College of Dentistry
College of Veterinary Medicine
College of Rehabilitative Sciences
College of Pre-Medicine
College of IT & Engineering
Business School
School of Health & Allied Health Sciences
School of Medicine
School of Law & Government
School of Design + Communication
SWU "Next" Programs
Basic Education (preschool, primary, junior high)
Senior High School

Former programs

Professional programs
College of Dentistry
College of Law
College of Medicine
College of Optometry
Graduate School 
Doctorate degree programs
Master's degree programs

Allied Medical
College of Medical Technology
College of Radiologic Technology
College of Nursing
College of Pharmacy
College of Physical Therapy
College of Veterinary Medicine

Non-allied Medical
College of Arts & Sciences
College of Computer Studies
College of Criminology
College of Education
College of Engineering
SWU Maritime Regiment
School of Business

Basic Education
 Pre-school, Elementary, Junior High, Senior High

Continuing Education
 English Language Program
 Certified Public Education (CPE)

Notable alumni

Politics
 Allan L. Rellon

Sports
 Cyrus Baguio
 Arlo Chavez
 Ric-Ric Marata 
 Yoyong Martirez
 Ben Mbala
 Mary Joy Tabal
 Mac Tallo
 Jojo Tangkay

Entertainment
 Ahmed Cuizon
 Ernesto Lariosa
 Alma Moreno

See also
 Matias H. Aznar Memorial College of Medicine

Sources
http://www.swu.edu.ph/about.php?idname=history
http://www.university-directory.eu/Philippines/Southwestern-University.html
Southwestern University Handbook

References

External links
Southwestern University official website
Southwestern University at the Philippine Education Network

 

Educational institutions established in 1946
Universities and colleges in Cebu City
Schools in Cebu City
1946 establishments in the Philippines
Dental schools in the Philippines